La Humanidad ('The Humanity') was a weekly anarcho-syndicalist newspaper published from La Paz, Bolivia. La Humanidad was founded in 1928 as the organ of the Federación Obrera Local de La Paz (FOL, 'Local Workers Federation of La Paz'). FOL had emerged out of a split from the Marxist-oriented Federación Obrera del Trabajo. Directors of the newspaper included Guillermo Pelaez, G. Maceda, D. Osuna and Luis Salvatierra. The newspaper opposed involvement of the labour movement in electoral politics. After just seven issues, the newspaper found itself indebted and unprofitable.

References

1928 establishments in Bolivia
1928 disestablishments in Bolivia
Anarchism in Bolivia
Anarchist newspapers
Defunct newspapers published in Bolivia
Mass media in La Paz
Newspapers published in Bolivia
Publications established in 1928
Publications disestablished in 1928
Spanish-language newspapers